Kevin Kunz (born 22 January 1992) is a German professional footballer who plays for Carl Zeiss Jena as a goalkeeper.

Club career
Kunz signed with SSV Jahn Regensburg in January 2020.

References

External links
 
 

Living people
1992 births
Association football goalkeepers
German footballers
SG Sonnenhof Großaspach players
SSV Jahn Regensburg players
FC Carl Zeiss Jena players
2. Bundesliga players
3. Liga players
Regionalliga players